Atushe (born John Namweya, 26 August 1976, Tsumeb, Namibia) is a Namibian musician, based in Windhoek, Namibia. With a career spanning nine years, he has produced numerous hits and five albums to date. Atushe started singing at an early age in a family choir, Sunday school then later on in a school choir. Atushe won a best body builder title in 2010.

Discography
 2nd Chance (Piracy/Poverty), 2011
 Imbo, 2009
 Tangi, 2008
 Credit for My Promise, 2006 (former name, Tyson)
 Oye Naana, 2005 (former name, Tyson)

Music awards
 Best Kizomba, Namibian Music Awards (NAMA), 2012
 Best Kizomba, Namibian Music Awards (NAMA), 2011
 Best Music Video, Sanlam/NBC Music Awards, 2004

Non music awards
 Namibia Bodybuilding Championship, 2010

References

External links
 Namibiansun.com
 Sun.com.na
 Informante.web.na
 Newera.com.na
 Republikein.com.na
 Southernaftricannewspaper.com

1976 births
Living people
People from Tsumeb
21st-century Namibian male singers
Musicians from Windhoek